María Vargas may refer to:

María Cecilia Vargas (born 1957), Mexican Olympic swimmer
Maria Paula Vargas (born 1995), Spanish artistic gymnast
María José Vargas (born 1993), Bolivian-born Argentine racquetball player
María Villaseñor Vargas (born 1960), Mexican politician
The heroine, played by Ava Gardner, of the 1954 film The Barefoot Contessa